Benarkin is a rural town and locality in the South Burnett Region, Queensland, Australia. The nearby town of Blackbutt is the origin of the town and the two towns are often referred to as the joint entity Blackbutt-Benarkin.

Geography
The Benarkin State Forest is located to the east and south of the town.

History
The locality name Benarkin takes its name from ''Benarqui'' from the, Dungibara language which refers to the blackbutt tree (Eucalyptus pilularis) which are common in the district. When the Blackbutt railway station was built to serve the town of Blackbutt, it was some distance from the town, so it was decided to name the railway station Bernakin in 1910 and this name was then used for the settlement that grew up around the railway station. Because of the close proximity ( apart) and intertwined history of the two towns, they are often referred to as the twin towns of Blackbutt-Benarkin.
Macnamara's Camp Provisional School opened on 4 July 1910 but in November 1910 it was moved to Well Holes and renamed Well Holes Provisional School. In 1911, it was renamed Benarkin Provisional School. The school was operating from a tent. In March 1913 a building was constructed and it became Benarkin State School on 1 April 1913. It closed in 1920, but reopened on 4 September 1935.

Benarkin Post Office opened by March 1911.

On 11 November 1996, a memorial was established to jointly commemorate the soldiers who took part in the Battle of Hill 60 at Gallipoli in World War I and the pioneer forestry workers of the district. The memorial is located on Hill 60 Road in the Benarkin State Forest.

On 1 February 2018, Benarkin's postcode changed from 4306 to 4314.

Heritage listings
Benarkin has a number of heritage-listed sites, including:
 off D'Aguilar Highway: Taromeo Homestead

Education
Benarkin State School is a government primary (Prep-6) school for boys and girls at Scott Street. In 2017, the school had an enrolment of 27 students with 6 teachers (4 full-time equivalent) and 5 non-teaching staff (3 full-time equivalent).

There is no secondary school in Benarkin, the nearest are in Nanango, Toogoolawah and Kilcoy.

Attractions
The Brisbane Valley Rail Trail passes through Benarkin, following the route of the former railway line. It is for walking and cycling, no motorised vehicles are permitted.

References

Further reading

External links

 
 

Towns in Queensland
South Burnett Region
Localities in Queensland